Axbridge was a rural district in Somerset, England, from 1894 to 1974.  It was named after the town of Axbridge.

It was created in 1894 under the Local Government Act 1894 as a successor to the Axbridge rural sanitary district.

In 1974 it was abolished under the Local Government Act 1972.  The area was split between three districts.  The civil parishes of Banwell, Bleadon, Butcombe, Churchill, Congresbury, Hutton, Kewstoke, Locking, Puxton, Wick St. Lawrence, Winscombe and Wrington, and part of the parishes of Blagdon, Burrington and Loxton became part of the Woodspring district in the new county of Avon, with the remainder of the district becoming part of the Sedgemoor district in Somerset.

References
Axbridge RD at Vision of Britain
Local Government Act 1972

Districts of England created by the Local Government Act 1894
Districts of England abolished by the Local Government Act 1972
History of Somerset
Local government in Somerset
Rural districts of England